Daria Sergeyevna Samokhina (born 12 August 1992) is a Russian handballer for HC Astrakhanochka and the Russian national team.

International honours
EHF Cup:
Winner : 2014
Finalist : 2018
EHF Cup Winners' Cup:
Finalist : 2016

Individual awards 
Russian Super League Top Scorer: 2019
World University Handball Championship Top Scorer: 2016

References

External links

1992 births
Living people
Sportspeople from Tolyatti
Russian female handball players